The Terrebonne Cobras are a junior ice hockey team from Terrebonne, Quebec, Canada, part of the Quebec Junior Hockey League.

Since relocating to Terrebonne, the Cobras are two time Quebec Junior League Champions winning in 2010 and again last year in 2017.  Both championships advance the organization to the Fred Page Cup to determine an eastern Canada champion to compete in the National Championships. The Cobras efforts in 2010 were stopped in the Fred Page Cup by eventual National Champions Pembroke Lumber Kings.  The second opportunity the Cobras won their first Fred Page Cup and made it to the semifinals at the National finals.

Season-by-season record
Note: GP = Games Played, W = Wins, L = Losses, T = Ties, OTL = Overtime Losses, GF = Goals for, GA = Goals against

Fred Page Cup
Eastern Canada Championships
MHL - QAAAJHL - CCHL - Host
Round robin play with 2nd vs 3rd in semi-final to advance against 1st in the finals.

Royal Bank Cup
CANADIAN NATIONAL CHAMPIONSHIPS
Dudley Hewitt Champions - Central, Fred Page Champions - Eastern, Western Canada Cup Champions - Western, Trenton Golden HawksWestern Canada Cup - Runners Up and Host
Round robin play with top 4 in semi-final and winners to finals.

External links
Cobras Webpage
RDS Webpage

Ligue de Hockey Junior AAA Quebec teams
Terrebonne, Quebec